Gerd Schönfelder (born 2 September 1970 in Kulmain) is a German para-alpine skier, one of the most decorated in the sport's history.

Biography
Gerd Schönfelder was born as the middle of three children; he has an older sister as well as a younger brother. During his youth he already did many types of sports, including skiing. However, prior to his accident he never had interest making a career out of it.

On September 11 1989, Schönfelder tried to catch a train in Hersbruck who was already leaving the station. Back then it was still possible to open the doors while it was driving. However, due to holding his jacket in his left hand, he wasn't able to get in. While making every attempt to open the door, Schönfelder stumbled and was dragged below the train. He ducked, but due to him lying on the shoulder and his left hand laying on the rails by accident, he was hit by the train's bottom. In spite of his severe injuries, he got up by himself and was taken to the hospital in Erlangen. The doctors were able to save his life, however, they forced to amputate both his right arm (including the shoulder) and all fingers of his left hand safe for the thumb. Even though it seemed like he could do nothing by himself anymore, his friends helped him to find joy in life again, they even would build a motorcycle he could use with the remainder of his hand. He also played soccer and eventually got into skiing. Eventually he heard of the Paralympics and due to his young age, he decided to make it a career. Also, in early 1991, through an operation, his left toe was transplanted on his hand, so that he could grab things again and manage life by himself.

Schönfelder won his first three gold medals at the 1992 Winter Paralympics. He has won an overall of sixteen gold medals at the Winter Paralympics, including four gold medals at the Salt Lake 2002 Games as well as four gold medals at the Vancouver 2010 Games and has won 22 Paralympic medals in his career. For his performance at the 2010 Games Schonfelder was won Best Male at the Paralympic Sports Awards.

He retired from skiing in January 2011.

See also
Athletes with most gold medals in one event at the Paralympic Games

References 

Athlete Search Results - Schoenfelder, Gerd - International Paralympic Committee

External links 
 
 

Paralympic gold medalists for Germany
Alpine skiers at the 1992 Winter Paralympics
Alpine skiers at the 1994 Winter Paralympics
Alpine skiers at the 1998 Winter Paralympics
Alpine skiers at the 2002 Winter Paralympics
Alpine skiers at the 2006 Winter Paralympics
Alpine skiers at the 2010 Winter Paralympics
1970 births
Living people
Medalists at the 2006 Winter Paralympics
Medalists at the 2010 Winter Paralympics
Medalists at the 2002 Winter Paralympics
Medalists at the 1998 Winter Paralympics
Medalists at the 1994 Winter Paralympics
Medalists at the 1992 Winter Paralympics
Paralympic silver medalists for Germany
German male alpine skiers
Paralympic Sport Awards — Best Male winners
Paralympic medalists in alpine skiing
Paralympic alpine skiers of Germany
20th-century German people
21st-century German people